Efke is the brand name of photographic films, papers, and chemicals that were manufactured by Fotokemika Zagreb d.d., a company located in Samobor, Croatia.

Products description

 
The Efke films are black-and-white films with high silver content and as a result give a large exposure latitude and high quality grayscale reproduction when compared with modern films. The Efke 25, 50 and 100 products were made using the ADOX formulas that were first introduced in the 1950s. 

Efke also made an infrared film sold as Efke IR820, a color film branded as "efkecolor" in ISO speeds of 100/400(from 1986-1992), spektar 100/200/400(from around 1992-2009) and HG100(from around 1996-?) as well as a 100 ISO color reversal film called "efkechrome"(from 1982-1999).
 
Color Efke films are insanely rare now days and more detailed information is almost impossible to find due to the color films lineup being discontinued rather quickly compared to Efke's other product lines.

The black and white Efke films are more forgiving of exposure variations than modern tabular crystal films. The nature of the product also allows large, grain free, enlargements to be made from negatives.

Efke black and white films were coated in one layer, unlike most other films which are coated in multiple layers. This makes the film thinner and the emulsion more easily damaged, especially when still wet after development. A hardening fixer can be used to help protect the emulsion. The film base is also thinner and more transparent, making inspection of the negative easier. However it can also make the film curl more easily.

Efke was one of the last manufacturers still making the once-popular 127 film, and indeed was the only manufacturer in the world making 127 format film between 1995, when Kodak discontinued the format, and 2006, when a Canadian company also began making 127.

Efke's Infrared Film, sold under the brand name Efke IR820 was the only infrared film manufactured that has good IR sensitivity beyond 750 nm extending out to 820 nm. In the past other films such as Kodak's HIE offered this but have recently been discontinued and are no longer made.

Closing

Fotokemika ceased all production on 30th August 2012.  

As a result of the breakup of Yugoslavia in the 1990s and the subsequent privatization process of the company, its equipment and Real Estate were sold to western companies and many of its workers laid off during the 90s and 2000s, which  ultimately lead the comapany to its bankruptcy.

For a short while after its closing the company existed as a distributor of medical films and materials made by other manufacturers.

Legacy 
There have been efforts to save the Fotokemika heritage.

In late 2020 croatian photographer Silvester Kolbas organized an exhibition about efke, the company Fotokemika Zagreb d.d and its heritage at the Museum of Technology "Nikola Tesla", Zagreb, called "Fotokemika" showcasing old equipment and products, that were left behind in the abandoned factory facilities of Fotokemika Zagreb d.d, as well as photos taken with expired efke black and white film.

References

External links
 Unofficial Fotokemika Website: http://www.fotokemika.hr/ (this site remains incomplete and has not been updated since 2007)

Manufacturing companies of Croatia
Photography companies of Croatia
Photographic film makers
Defunct photography companies